The Borrowers Afield is a children's  fantasy novel by Mary Norton, published in 1955 by Dent in the UK and Harcourt in the US. It was the second of five books in a series that is usually called The Borrowers, inaugurated by The Borrowers in 1952.

Plot
Kate is looking at a cottage with her aunt Mrs May. Kate learns that the present tenant Tom Goodenough knows Arrietty Clock, a tiny "Borrower" also known to Mrs May's brother. Tom relates the troubles of Arrietty and her parents. Driven from their home in an old English house, unable to track down their relatives, they live in an old boot.

Spiller, a mysterious wild Borrower, brings meat and saves Arrietty from a dog attack. Although everything outdoors — cows, moths, field mice, cold weather — endangers the Borrowers' lives, they learn to survive in the wild. One night, a Romani Mild Eye finds his lost boot and brings the Clocks back to his caravan. Tom and Spiller rescue the Clocks. In their new home with Tom, they find their long-lost relatives. In Tom, Arrietty finds a good friend and ally.

Characters

Borrowers
 Arrietty Clock, fourteen-year-old spirited daughter
 Pod Clock, father
 Homily Clock, mother
 Spiller, a wild Borrower

Human beans or "Big people"
May
 Kate 
 Tom Goodenough, tenant
 Mild Eye
Gypsy

Adaptations

The Borrowers (TV miniseries)

References 

The Borrowers
Children's fantasy novels
British children's novels
English fantasy novels
J. M. Dent books
Low fantasy novels
Novels set in England
1955 fantasy novels
1955 British novels
1955 children's books
British novels adapted into television shows
Sequel novels